District councils

Whole council

In 153 English district authorities the whole council was up for election.

Third of council

In 78 English district authorities one third of the council was up for election.

District councils